Rimfire is a 1949 American Western film directed by B. Reeves Eason. It is a noir Western.

Plot
The plot is a mystery revolving around Captain Tom Harvey, an undercover army agent played by James Millican, who is investigating the theft of army gold shipments. During his undercover investigations, Harvey takes on the job of deputy sheriff and is drawn into discovering the source of a ghost who is terrorizing the town. The ghost is apparently the manifestation of a gambler who was wrongly convicted and hanged for the gold thefts.

Cast 
 James Millican as Captain Tom Harvey
 Mary Beth Hughes as Polly
 Reed Hadley as The Abeline Kid
 Henry Hull as Editor Nathaniel Greeley 
 Victor Kilian as Sheriff Jim Jordan 
 Fuzzy Knight as Porky Hodges
 Chris-Pin Martin as Chico
 George Cleveland as Judge Gardner
 Margia Dean as Lolita
 Ray Bennett as Barney Bernard
 Glenn Strange as Curt Calvin
 John Cason as Blazer
 Jason Robards, Sr. as Banker Elkins
 I. Stanford Jolley as Toad Tyler
 Ben Erway as Deputy Sheriff Harry Wilson

Production
Filming started December 15, 1948.

Margia Dean recalled "It was a good little picture. Some of them I made were corny, but this was pretty well done. These films were done fast with last minute script changes. If you hit your spot and said the dialogue, it was printed."

References

External links 

1949 films
1949 Western (genre) films
American Western (genre) films
American black-and-white films
Lippert Pictures films
Films directed by B. Reeves Eason
1940s English-language films
1940s American films